Johann Joachim Schwabe (29 September 1714 – 12 August 1784) was a German academic, poet and translator.

1714 births
1784 deaths
18th-century German writers
18th-century German male writers
Academic staff of Leipzig University
German translators
Writers from Magdeburg
English–German translators
French–German translators
German male poets
German male non-fiction writers
18th-century translators